Mom is a 2017 Indian Hindi crime thriller film directed by Ravi Udyawa, with a screenplay by Girish Kohli. The film stars Sridevi as a vigilante who sets out to avenge her stepdaughter after she is sexually assaulted at a party. It co-stars Nawazuddin Siddiqui, Akshaye Khanna, and Pakistani actors Sajal Aly and Adnan Siddiqui. The film's music was composed and produced by A. R. Rahman.

Mom was released on 7 July 2017 in four languages. It was a global blockbuster, grossing  worldwide. The film received good reviews from critics, with Sridevi receiving widespread acclaim for her "powerhouse" performance. It was her 300th (and final) major film appearance before her death on 24 February 2018. 

Mom received two awards at the 65th National Film Awards: Best Actress (Sridevi, the first posthumous award in that category) and Best Background Score (Rahman). The film received six nominations at he 63rd Filmfare Awards, including Best Actress and Best Actress (Critics) (both for Sridevi) and Best Supporting Actor (Siddiqui).

Plot

Devki Sabarwal is a vivacious biology teacher who is popular with her students. In class, student Mohit Chadda sends Devki's stepdaughter, Arya, an offensive video; Devki throws his phone out the window. At home, despite Devki's persistence and warmth, Arya rebuffs her attempts to build a relationship. When Arya is invited to Valentine's Day party at Zodiac Farms, Devki and her husband Anand reluctantly allow her to go. Arya rejects the advances of Mohit and his cousin, Charles Deewan, at the party. Angered by the public rejection, Charles, Mohit, their criminal friend Joginder "Jagan" Singh, and farmhouse security guard Baburam Yadav attack Arya when she leaves the party. They brutally strangle and rape her and, leaving her for dead, dump her in a roadside ditch. Arya is found barely alive, and brought to a hospital; Devki and Anand are shattered. She quickly recovers, and names her attackers.

Inspector Mathew Francis quickly rounds up the perpetrators. His case falls apart when Arya is found to be drinking, however, raising the possibility that her memory is unreliable; in addition, the tardily-collected semen samples were too weak to match those of her attackers. The four attackers are acquitted due to a lack of evidence. Arya, in shock and broken by the verdict, pulls away from Devki (who realizes that she has probably lost Arya forever).

Devki remembers a shady detective, Dayashankar Kapoor ("DK"), whom she had met on the night Arya was raped. The father of a daughter, DK understands her pain and agrees to help her seek justice and revenge for Arya. Devki enlists former students to attack Baburam, the security guard, and they seduce and drug him. He awakens four days later, still drunk and remembering nothing, and discovers that he has been castrated. In a state of shock, he dies in an accident. Devki then breaks into Charles' home and mixes crushed apple seeds – a source of cyanide – into his powdered nutritional supplement; Charles is paralyzed. When Mohit visits Charles at the hospital, Devki (tipped off by DK) plants apple seeds and other evidence at Mohit's home; however, she leaves behind her glasses. Mathew quickly arrests Mohit; Charles is dying, and Mohit will be charged with murder.

As Devki eliminates each of Arya's attackers, their stories appear on the news and Arya is surprised. She believes that a vigilante (perhaps her father) is at work, and is deeply grateful to him. Mathew also suspects Anand, since he had attacked Mohit in court; when he has him tailed, however, he learns nothing. Mathew finds Devki's glasses in Mohit's apartment, and begins to suspect her. He warns Devki that the fourth man, Jagan, is a hardened criminal; going after him will endanger her family. Jagan visits Mohit, who is being physically abused by another inmate in prison. He then visits Charles, who tells him before he dies that Devki is retaliating. Jagan goes after DK and learns that Devki and her family are on holiday at a snow cottage in Kufri. He kills DK, and goes after Devki. Mathew finds a hidden camera in DK's glasses, and hurries to save Devki.

Jagan cuts the power to the cottage and shoots Anand. There is a scuffle, and Arya runs out into the snow. Jagan chases her, and Devki tries to save her stepdaughter. Jagan is about to kill Devki when Mathew tackles him. In a standoff, Devki and Mathew point their guns at Jagan; Matthew tries to dissuade her by telling her that Anand is alive, and she will go to jail if she shoots Jagan. Jagan angrily describes how Devki finished off the other attackers, and Arya listens from the bushes. Devki knows if Jagan is left alive, he will come after her again; Mathew then hands her his gun and urges her to kill him. Devki hesitates, but when an overwhelmed Arya acknowledges calls her "Mom" for the first time she shoots Jagan dead. Arya and Devki share a tearful, tender embrace.

Cast
Sridevi as Devki Sabarwal
Akshaye Khanna as Inspector Mathew Francis
Sajal Aly as Arya Sabarwal
Adnan Siddiqui as Anand Sabarwal
Pitobash Tripathy as Guard Baburam Pandey
Abhimanyu Singh as Joginder "Jagan" Singh
Nawazuddin Siddiqui as Detective Dayashankar Kapoor ("DK") 
Adarsh Gourav as Mohit Chadha
Vikas Verma as Charles Deewan
Riva Arora as Priya "Piyu" Sabarwal, Devki and Anand's daughter and Aarya's half-sister
Vara Raturi as Sapna, Aarya's best friend.
Ivan Sylvester Rodrigues as Aarya's school principal
Tripti Dimri as Swati, Aarya's and Mohit's classmate

Production

Casting and development
It was announced in early 2016 that Sridevi would star in Boney Kapoor's upcoming women's film, Mom, which would be directed by Ravi Udyawar. Nawazuddin Siddiqui was cast in a leading role, and said that it was a dream come true for him to work with Sridevi. Akshaye Khanna and actors Sajal Aly and Adnan Siddiqui were then cast, and A. R. Rahman was signed to compose the film's music.

Filming
Filming began in New Delhi in March 2016 near Shri Ram College of Commerce at Delhi University and Noida Film City. Mom was then filmed on a lengthy schedule in Mestia, Georgia. The crew shot in freezing conditions for over two months. Despite the weather, filming was successful. Shooting resumed in March 2017, and the film's last leg was completed in Bangkok.

Release and marketing
Mom was previewed at the 2017 Zee Cine Awards by Salman Khan, who called Sridevi "a bigger star than the Khans." Sridevi shared the trailer on Twitter, where it went viral. It had 1.2 million views in its first 24 hours on YouTube, and had a positive reception in Pakistan. The trailer's success had distributors in South India asking for a dubbed version of the film. The filmmakers announced that Mom would also be dubbed and released in Tamil, Telugu and Malayalam.

The film was released in China on 22 March 2019, two years after its release in India. Zee Studios International, its distributors, released an international poster for Chinese audiences.

Reception

Box office 
Mom grossed 14.25 crore on its first domestic weekend, and had a domestic gross of about 51.78 crore.

The film was released in China on 10 May 2019. By 4 June 2019, Mom had grossed  in China.

Critical response

Mom received positive reviews from critics, with Sridevi's performance receiving widespread critical acclaim. Meena Iyer of The Times of India gave the film four stars out of five and said, "This one still manages to stay ahead with some interesting twists and turns". Sarita A. Tanwar of Daily News and Analysis gave it three stars, saying, "Mom is interestingly cast and that's a major part of the battle won." Shubhra Gupta of The Indian Express gave the film two out of five stars: "The plot is riddled with holes, and is too focused on Sridevi." Saibal Chatterjee of NDTV India gave it 3.5 out of five stars, saying that the film was not a "conventional rape-and-revenge drama" with a "clearly defined moral and emotional context." Mayank Shekhar of Mid-Day gave it three out of five stars; "the filmmakers effectively employ their talent" on the ensemble cast, characters, and "fine passages of photography and production design." According to an IANS review in The Economic Times, "The scenes are cut in a way that they heighten the drama without resorting to hysteria." Kunal Guha of the Mumbai Mirror gave the film 3.5 out of five stars and said, "Several scenes in Mom wordlessly convey more than what can be said through dialogue." Rajeev Masand of News18 India gave it 2.5 out of five stars and said, "Mom is a far from perfect film, but it's never boring." Rohit Vats of Hindustan Times gave the film three stars out of five and said that it "can hold the audience's attention".

Sridevi's performance was highlighted. India Today called the actress "unbelievably good as the mother thirsty for revenge," and NDTV found her "magnificently expressive as the titular figure." A reviewer in The Times of India said that she gave a "captivating performance where she walks you through the entire gamut of emotions with panache", and an Indian Express reviewer wrote: "Sridevi needs only a twitch or a glance to prove that she is a powerhouse and there are several scenes she lifts by just being there." According to Deccan Chronicle, "Turning your eyes elsewhere will be criminal when Sridevi is on screen in the film," and Rediff called the actress "the master of expressivity ... it's classic Sridevi." Rajeev Masand said, "Sridevi's performance elevates Mom to another level". According to a Firstpost review, "Here is a 53-year-old leading actress doing what Amitabh Bachchan once excelled at ... Sridevi is a far more riveting watch than a shirtless Salman Khan with his 6 plus packs or the quintessential middle-aged Hindi film hero, who refuses to grow up ... Suddenly, Bollywood shines bright with hope for the heroine over 50."

Manjusha Radhakrishnan of Gulf News gave Mom 3.5 out of five stars, calling the film a "taut thriller studded with some superlative performances". Sadaf Siddique of Dawn wrote, "It is the riveting performances that hold the narrative together despite its flaws." Rohit Bhatnagar of Deccan Chronicle gave the film three out of five stars in a lukewarm review: "Although the production of the film makes it look grand and fancy, the climax is too dramatic for such an intense film."

Awards and nominations

Soundtrack

Mom soundtrack album was released on 27 June 2017 by T-Series. Its first song, "O Sona Tere Liye", was praised; The Indian Express called it as "a soothing balm for a hurt soul," and a Times of India reviewer said that the "song will stir your soul." Rahman received the National Film Award for Best Music Direction - Background Score.

Notes: "Freakin' Life" and "Be Nazaara" were reused in the Tamil, Telugu and Malayalam versions with no changes. "Maafi Mushqil" appears only in the Hindi version. "Be Nazaara" is a traditional composition, arranged by A. R. Rahman for the film.

See also

2012 Delhi gang rape and murder
 I Spit on Your Grave
 Death Wish

References

External links
 
 

2017 films
2017 thriller drama films
Films set in Georgia (country)
Indian feminist films
Films about rape in India
Films about social issues in India
Films about women in India
Films set in Delhi
Indian legal films
2010s Hindi-language films
Films shot in Georgia (country)
Indian thriller drama films
Films scored by A. R. Rahman
Transgender-related films
Films featuring a Best Actress National Award-winning performance
Hindi-language drama films